The Learning Company was an American educational software company founded in 1980. Its name and branding have been used by multiple other companies since its dissolution in 1995.

The Learning Company may also refer to:
 SoftKey, a Canadian shovelware company which purchased The Learning Company and assumed its name from 1995–1999
 Broderbund, an American software company whose educational software line was rebranded under the Learning Company name in 1998
 Mattel Interactive, which acquired and merged its educational software line with the Learning Company brand in 1999
 The Gores Group, which acquired the Learning Company brand in 2000

See also 

 The Teaching Company, a provider of college-level video courses and documentaries